Yaw's Top Notch was a restaurant in Portland, Oregon.

The original restaurant operated from 1926 to 1985. The business once employed 180 people.

The restaurant was revived by owner Stephen Yaw in 2012, but closed eight months later.

References

1926 establishments in Oregon
Defunct restaurants in Portland, Oregon
Restaurants established in 1926